André Fau (Paris November 13, 1896, January 31, 1982) was a French post-Cubist artist, architect, ceramist, songwriter, poet born in Paris.

Biography 

Fau studied decorative arts at the École des Beaux-Arts and under Gabriel Ferrier.

Since 1919 dedicated himself to literature.
In 1920 he founded a book association Young Songs, at Gozlin street, Saint Germain des Prés.

Since 1921 till 1932 he started to dive deep into ceramic art. André Fau had patents on inventions in decorative art that got widely popular, were published and especially appreciated in Japan. He also became the youngest juror of the decorative art exposition. He created crystal objects models for a Czech factory. And the same years famous composers of the time wrote songs based on his lyrics.

In the 1930s during an economic crisis he came up with his friends how to help artists in a rather unusual for that time manner — opening an exposition sale on the walls of the bar “Bar efte” (Le Rond-Point des Artistes, 5. r. du Metz).

In 1944 he published a significant work “Montmartre village de Paris”. This book contains 25 watercolors where Fau expressed his tender love to Montmartre. The book was a great success and it completed collections of bibliophiles.

In France, Sweden, America, Japan and in the whole world André Fau exhibited his works along with famous artists such as Pablo Picasso, André Dunoyer de Segonzac, Raoul Dufy, Yves Brayer and many others.

In 1982 André Fau’s works were presented on the exhibition “Les Peintres indépendants de Montmartre 1920-1940” along with works of Maurice Utrillo, Suzanne Valadon, Gen Paul, Marcel Leprin, Edmond Heuze, Max Jacob, Élisée Maclet, Jules Pascin, Louis Marcoussis, Charles Camoin, Gus Bofa, Chas Laborde and others.

Today his works are repeatedly being sold on different auctions around the world. Including such prestigious as Sotheby’s and Christie’s.

Family 
Wife Suzanne-Marie-Thérèse Denglos-Fau (1922-2002), а writer and a poet.
Difference in age of this married couple was almost 26 years. Despite that their relationships became an illustration of elite art marriages of Montmartre.

References

External links 
 Works André Fau; pictify.com
 Fau, André - Biography, Art Deco Ceramic Glass Light
 Benezit Dictionary of Artists, 2006, site Oxford Index (subscription or library membership required)
 Comoedia illustré, 1929-06,  Comœdia illustré : journal artistique bi-mensue, p.29; Gallica BnF
 Comoedia, 1933/12/21 (A27,N7621), p.1, Le Salon de Echanges..; La Semaine à Paris,  1934/02/02 (N610)-1934/02/08, p.44; Le Figaro, 1936/02/28 (Numéro 59), p.4 Poètes aux cabarets at cabarets sans poètes; Gallica BnF

1896 births
1982 deaths
School of Paris
20th-century French painters
20th-century French male artists
French male painters
Modern painters
Cubist artists
Futurist painters
Art Deco artists
École des Beaux-Arts alumni
20th-century ceramists
French ceramists
20th-century French poets
20th-century French sculptors
French male sculptors
French male poets
20th-century French male writers